Duele Menos (English: Hurts Less) is a Latin pop song written and performed by Kany García. The song was chosen as the first single from Kany's fourth studio album En Vivo: Kany Garcia. The song was released to digital outlets on May 27, 2014. The song debuted on iTunes Latin Charts at #28.

Composition
Kany Garcia explains the reason for the song: "'Duele Menos' is the song for all ... We have all sprung things along the way: jobs, boyfriends, friends, colleagues, cities, lovers, hobbies. Whenever something or someone is left in the past, before the spectators show us strong, but we all have a day that we let ourselves be tempted by nostalgia. This song is the way to say I'm human, I feel alive and I allow myself. At some point in life we've all had this experience. It's a song full of strength."

Music video
The video, directed by Kelvin Rosa and produced by LabTwenty, was filmed in the Emilio S. Belaval Theater at the University of the Sacred Heart in San Juan, Puerto Rico.

Charts

References

2014 songs
Kany García songs
Songs written by Kany García